BAFTA is the British Academy of Film and Television Arts.

Specific topics associated with the British Academy of Film and Television Arts include:
 BAFTA Film Awards
 BAFTA TV Awards
 BAFTA Children's Awards
 BAFTA Games Awards
 BAFTA Cymru, the Welsh branch of the British Academy of Film and Television Arts
 BAFTA Scotland, the Scottish branch of the British Academy of Film and Television Arts

BAFTA or Bafta may also refer to:
 Baltic Free Trade Area, a 1994–2004 free trade agreement between Estonia, Latvia and Lithuania
 Bafta cloth, a plain weave textile originally made in India